Pachygnatha clerckoides is a spider species found in Bulgaria and Macedonia.

See also
 List of Tetragnathidae species

References

External links

Tetragnathidae
Spiders of Europe
Spiders described in 1985